The following is a partial list of dams in Kenya.

During Kenya's colonial era, the word "dam" referred to both the structure as well as the reservoir or lake impounded by it.

 Gitaru Reservoir
 Kamburu Dam
 Kiambere Reservoir
 Kindaruma Reservoir
 Masinga Reservoir
 Koromojo Dam
 Masinga Dam
 Mukurumudzi Dam
 Nairobi Dam
 Ruiru Dam
 Rukenya Dam
 Sasamua Dam
 Thika Dam

References

Dams in Kenya
Kenya
Dams and reservoirs